Minor Rajya Sabha elections were held in 2013, to elect members of the Rajya Sabha, Indian Parliament's upper chamber also known as the Council of States. Routine elections were held in May and June among proportionately qualifying legislators to elect (nominate) two members from Assam and six from Tamil Nadu, to the 245-member body.

By-elections were also held among legislators of the States of Bihar, Meghalaya, Karnataka, (one seat for each) and two in Uttar Pradesh.

Elections

Assam

Tamil Nadu

Bye-elections

Bihar
 A bye election was announced to be held on 14 February, to fill the vacancy caused by resignation of Upendra Kushwaha from JD(U) representing Bihar. K. C. Tyagi of JDU won the election unopposed on 7 February to serve until 7 July 2016.

Meghalaya
 A bye election was announced to be held on 18 April, to fill the vacancy caused by resignation of Thomas A. Sangma from NCP representing Meghalaya. Wansuk Syiem of INC won the election unopposed on 11 April 2013 to serve until 12 April 2014

Karnataka
 A bye election was announced to be held on 29 August, to fill the vacancy caused by resignation of Anil Lad from INC representing Karnataka. B. K. Hariprasad of INC won the election unopposed on 22 August 2013 to serve until 25 June 2014.

Uttar Pradesh
 Two bye elections were announced to be held on 20 December, to fill the vacancies caused by death of Mohan Singh of SP and disqualification of Rasheed Masood of INC representing Uttar Pradesh. Kanak Lata Singh of SP and Pramod Tiwari of INC were elected unopposed on Dec 13, 2013 to serve until 4 July 2016 and 2 April 2018 respectively.

References

2013 elections in India
2013